Arthur Leonard Newbery (6 January 1905 – 17 December 1976) was an English cricketer. Newbery was a right-handed batsman. He was born at Battle, Sussex.

Newbery made his first-class debut for Sussex against Cambridge University in 1925. He made two further first-class appearances for Sussex in that season, against Nottinghamshire and Worcestershire. In his three first-class matches, he scored a total of 58 runs at an average of 11.60, with a high score of 50 not out, which he made on debut against Cambridge University.

He died at Ightham, Kent on 17 December 1976.

References

External links
Leonard Newbery at ESPNcricinfo
Leonard Newbery at CricketArchive

1905 births
1976 deaths
People from Battle, East Sussex
English cricketers
Sussex cricketers
People from Ightham